Touch Racing Nitro is a racing game developed and published by Bravo Game Studios for iOS and Android in 2010, and for PlayStation 3 and PlayStation Portable in 2011.

Reception

The iOS version received "mixed" reviews according to the review aggregation website Metacritic.

References

External links
 

2010 video games
Android (operating system) games
IOS games
PlayStation 3 games
PlayStation Portable games
Racing video games
Video games developed in Spain
Single-player video games